Madeline Stuart is an Elle Decor A-List& Architectural Digest "AD100"  interior designer and furniture designer. She is based in Los Angeles, CA, and is self-described as "equally at ease designing a 1920s Hollywood hacienda, a Fifth Avenue Manhattan apartment or a Rocky Mountain retreat." Several publications have featured her works, including Galerie Magazine's inclusion of a Southern California home that displays modern art and a feature in Veranda displaying a home she restored that was built originally by Cedric Gibbons for his wife, the actress Dolores del Río.

References 

Living people
American interior designers
Year of birth missing (living people)